Sheila Reid (born 21 December 1937) is a Scottish actress, known for playing Madge Harvey in the ITV sitcom Benidorm (2007–2016). An original member of the Royal National Theatre in 1963, she played Bianca in the National's 1965 film version of Othello, with Laurence Olivier in the title role. Her other film appearances include Brazil (1985), The Winter Guest (1997) and Containment (2015).

Education
Born in Glasgow, Reid grew up in Bridge of Weir before her father's army career took the family to India. She was then educated at Moreton Hall School, a boarding independent school for girls, near the market town of Oswestry in Shropshire, in central England.

Career
Reid has had a long and distinguished career in theatre, film and television. She worked with Laurence Olivier at The Royal National Theatre in London.

Roles in film and television

1960s
On 27 November 1960, she appeared in ITV drama anthology series Armchair Theatre as Assistant Librarian in the episode 'Mr Nobody'.

On 11 July 1962, she appeared in ITV drama anthology series Tales of Mystery as Jessica in the episode 'Chinese Magic'.

On 29 January 1964, she appeared in BBC One's drama series Z Cars as Maureen Stringfellow in the episode 'A Stroll Along the Sands'.

On 2 June 1964, she appeared in ITV drama anthology series Love Story as Miss Watson in the episode 'The Wooing of Miss Watson'. Two years later, Reid re-appeared in the series, but was only credited as 'The Girl' in the episode 'Dead Set at Dream Boy' which aired on 25 July 1966.

On 7 May 1966, she appeared in ITV drama anthology series Knock on Any Door as Sue Burton in the episode 'Sunday in Prospective'.

On 7 June 1967, she appeared in BBC's television film adaptation of 1907 French stage play A Flea in Her Ear written by Georges Feydeau as Antoinette Plucheux.

On 8 October 1967, she appeared in BBC Two's drama anthology series Theatre 625 as Mavis in the episode 'The Lost Years of Brian Hooper'.

1970s
On 12 July 1970, she appeared in ITV drama anthology series ITV Sunday Night Theatre as Maria in the episode 'Twelfth Night'.

On 14 July 1971, The Touch directed by Ingmar Bergman was released in the US, starring Reid as Sara Kovac. The film received mixed to negative reviews from film critics and was a box office flop.

On 29 September 1971, she appeared in BBC One's drama series Owen, M.D. as Mrs. Shackles in the episode 'The Whole Hog, Part 1'. She returned to the role as Mrs. Shackles once more in the episode 'The Whole Hog, Part 2' which aired on 30 September 1971. In 1973, Reid returned to the series for three more episodes, this time as a different character, Mabel Simpson, in the episodes 'Water Under the Bridge' (22 April 1973), 'The Love Game' (3 June 1973) and 'Father of the Man' (6 May 1973).

On 3 April 1972, she appeared in BBC Two's drama anthology series Thirty-Minute Theatre as Mrs. Berry in the episode 'And for My Next Trick'.

On 2 March 1973, she appeared in ITV drama series Justice as Madge in the episode 'The Whole Truth?'.

On 22 May 1975, she appeared in BBC One's drama anthology series Play for Today as Vanessa Bagley in the episode 'Brassneck'.

On 29 December 1975, she appeared in BBC One's drama series Play of the Month as Lottie Grady in the episode 'When We Are Married'.

On 9 November 1976, she appeared in Australian miniseries The Emigrants as May Parker in the episode Chances for the Children. She returned to the role of May Parker twice more in the episode 'Endeavour' which aired on 16 November 1976 and '13,000 Miles Away' which aired on 23 November 1976. The show was broadcast on BBC One in the UK.

On 7 April 1978, she appeared in BBC One's comedy drama series All Creatures Great and Small as Mrs. Donovan in the episode 'Practice Makes Perfect'. She returned to the role of Mrs. Donovan once more in the episode 'Spring Fever' (29 September 1990).

On 22 October 1978, she appeared in ITV drama series Lillie as Queen Victoria in the episode 'Bertie'.

On 14 December 1978, she appeared in ITV police drama The Sweeney as Doreen Haskins in the episode 'Victims'.

1980s
In October 1980, Sir Henry at Rawlinson End was released in the UK, starring Reid as Lady Rawlinson. The film was praised by film critics and received mainly positive reviews.

On 12 June 1981, she appeared in ITV comedy drama series Get Lost! as Miss Langley in the episode 'Worried About Jim'. She returned to the role as Miss Langley in three more episodes, 'The Vicar Did It' (19 June 1981), 'Kiss Me Quick' (26 June 1981) and 'Not a Proper Ending' (3 July 1981).

On 8 January 1982, she appeared in BBC One's drama series Fame Is the Spur as Mrs. Ryerson in the episode 'Episode #1.1'. She returned to the role of Mrs. Ryerson in three more episodes, 'Episode #1.2' (15 January 1982), 'Episode #1.3' (22 January 1982) and 'Episode #1.4' (29 January 1982).

On 9 December 1983, she appeared in ITV comedy drama series Auf Wiedersehen, Pet as Patsy Busbridge in the episode 'Home Thoughts from Abroad'.

On 20 March 1984, she appeared in ITV drama series Miracles Take Longer as Mrs. Hook in the episode 'Episode #2.21'. She returned to the role of Mrs. Hook once more in the episode 'Episode #2.22' (26 March 1984).

On 19 January 1985, she appeared in BBC One's science fiction drama Doctor Who as Etta in the two part Sixth Doctor story Vengeance on Varos (19 and 26 January 1985).

1990s
On 20 April 1993, she appeared in ITV drama series Taggart as Jessie Fraser in the episode 'Gingerbread'.

On 10 March 1995, she appeared in ITV drama series Doctor Finlay as Tilda MacLean in the episode 'No Time for Heroes'.

On 9 July 1995, she appeared in BBC One's five part drama series Oliver's Travels as Eileen in the episode 'Do We Look Like That?'.

On 21 June 1998, she appeared in ITV family drama Where the Heart Is as Edith Woodford in the episode 'She Goes On'.

On 30 October 1998, Still Crazy was released in the UK, starring Reid as Mrs. Baggott. The film was praised by film critics and received mostly positive reviews.

On 7 December 1999, she appeared in ITV police procedural drama The Bill as Claire in the episode 'Consumers'. She returned to the role of Claire once more in the episode 'Lock In' (9 December 1999). She returned to the series many years later, this time as a different character, Audrey Thorp, in one more episode '431' (3 August 2006).

2000–present
On 2 October 2001, she appeared in BBC One's medical soap opera Doctors as Louise Kingston in the episode "Retiring the Past". She returned to the series on four more occasions, each time playing a different character. She played Ivy Brownlow in the episode "You People" (20 January 2009), Eena McFee in the episode "Seize the Day" (31 May 2011) and Sid Dalmond in the episode "Sid's Blues" (22 January 2014). On 17 April 2020, Reid appeared as 'Speedy Sue', a con artist.

On 15 September 2002, she appeared in BBC One's comedy drama series Monarch of the Glen as Reverend Alice in the episode 'Episode #4.3'.

On 17 January 2003, she appeared in ITV crime drama series Midsomer Murders as Mrs. Metcalfe in the episode 'Painted in Blood'.

On 17 September 2005, she appeared in BBC One's medical drama series Casualty as Cynthia Hollis in the episode 'Deep Water'. She returned to the series on three more occasions, each time playing a different character. She played Loretta Parks in the episode 'Into the Fog' (2 October 2010), Gwen Morgan in the episode 'Return to Sender' (25 October 2014) and Sheila Bobbins in the episode 'Schoolboy Crush' (24 September 2016).

On 18 January 2006, she appeared in BBC One's drama anthology series The Afternoon Play as Edith in the episode 'Your Mother Should Know'.

On 28 January 2006, she appeared in BBC One's paranormal mystery drama Sea of Souls as Aggie the Chambermaid in the episode 'The Newsroom'.

In late 2006, Reid was cast as loud-mouth Madge Harvey in the ITV sitcom Benidorm. Her character first appeared on 1 February 2007 in the first episode alongside her new on-screen family, The Garveys. It was announced on 8 January 2015 that Madge and The Garveys were leaving the show after nearly 8 years. They departed on the second episode of Series 7 (9 January 2015). On 17 April 2015, ITV confirmed Reid's return to the series and that she would appear in the third episode of Series 8. On 25 January 2016, Reid reprised her role as Madge for one episode.

On 13 November 2009, she appeared in BBC One's dark mystery series Psychoville as Old Crone in the 7th episode.

On 21 June 2012, she appeared in Sky Arts sketch show/comedy drama Psychobitches as Mother Teresa in the episode 'Pilot'. She returned to the series on three more occasions, each time playing a different character. She played Margot Fonteyn in the episode 'Episode #1.1' (30 May 2013), Betty Ford in the episode 'Episode #1.5' (27 June 2013) and Shirley Temple in the episode 'Episode #2.6' (23 December 2014).

On 25 December 2012, she appeared in BBC One's period drama Call the Midwife as Mrs. Jenkins in the Christmas Special episode.

On 13 February 2013, she appeared in BBC One's sitcom Bob Servant Independent as Margo Servant in the episode 'The Media'.

On 25 December 2013, she returned to Doctor Who, this time playing Clara Oswald's Grandmother in the Eleventh Doctor episode The Time of the Doctor.

On 6 May 2014, she appeared in BBC One's drama anthology series Comedy Playhouse as Lady Cairnsworth in the episode 'Miller's Mountain'.

On 1 November 2014, she appeared again in Doctor Who as Clara's Grandmother in the Twelfth Doctor episode Dark Water. She was simply credited as 'Gran' in the end credits to both episodes.

Roles in theatre

1960s
In 1963, she starred as Fio Bates in Half a Sixpence at The Cambridge Theatre in London.

1990s
In 1993, she starred as Beggar Woman in the London revival of Sweeney Todd at The Royal National Theatre.

In 1996, she starred as Celestine in Martin Guerre: The Musical at The Prince Edward Theatre in London.

In 1998, she starred as Jack's Mother in Into the Woods at The Donmar Warehouse in London.

2010–present
In 2017, she starred as Gloria in Silver Lining, a new sitcom written by Sandi Toksvig, at The Rose Theatre, Kingston in London.

Personal life
Reid was formerly married to actor Julian Curry. On 11 April 2008, after 32 years together, she and partner Terry Bullen were married in London, at a private ceremony watched by 12 close friends.

She is involved with charity Plan International.

Filmography

Film

Television

Video Game credits
 Final Fantasy XIV: Shadowbringers (2020) as Master Matoya (taking over the role from Sheila Steafel, who died in 2019)

Select National Theatre credits
 The Master Builder (1964)
 Othello (1964/1965)
 The Crucible (1965) directed by Laurence Olivier
 Love for Love (1965)
 Three Sisters (1967/1968) directed by Olivier
 Home and Beauty (1968/1969)
 Love's Labour's Lost (1968)
 Sweeney Todd: The Demon Barber of Fleet Street (1993)

Other selected theatre credits
 Martin Guerre: Prince Edward Theatre, London (1996)
 The Importance of Being Earnest: Theatre Royal Haymarket, London (1999)
Pericles, Prince of Tyre: Sam Wanamaker Playhouse, London (2015)
 Troilus and Cressida: Royal Shakespeare Company (2018)

References

External links

1937 births
Living people
People educated at Moreton Hall School
Scottish television actresses
Actresses from Glasgow
Scottish stage actresses
Scottish film actresses